James Madison Wells (January 7, 1808February 28, 1899) was elected Lieutenant Governor and became the 20th Governor of Louisiana during Reconstruction.

Early life
Born near Alexandria, Louisiana, on January 7, 1808, Wells' father was Samuel Levi Wells II, a member of Louisiana's constitutional convention in 1811. His mother was the former Dorcas Huie. A brother, Thomas Jefferson Wells, was involved in Louisiana politics. Samuel Wells died when James was 8 years old, leaving eight children.

Wells was educated at the Jesuit-run St. Joseph's College in Bardstown south of Louisville, Kentucky; Partridge's Academy, Middletown, Connecticut; and Cincinnati Law School. In Cincinnati, he was tutored in law by an old-line Federalist named Charles Hammond, who edited the Cincinnati Gazette. Hammond's frequent attacks on slavery failed to influence Wells. Wells later owned nearly one hundred slaves.

In 1829 he returned to Rapides Parish, to manage several of his family's plantations.

Political activities
In 1833, Wells married 15-year-old Mary Ann Scott; together they had 14 children. Wells inherited a substantial estate; he controlled a large cotton plantation called New Hope near Alexandria, a sugar plantation on Bayou Huffpower in Avoyelles Parish called Wellswood, and a large summer home Jessamine Hill near Lecompte, Louisiana. Wells was appointed Sheriff of Rapides Parish in 1840 by Governor Andre B. Roman. Wells was an active Whig and a large slave holder. Eventually, as the Whig Party collapsed in the 1850s, Wells became a Democrat. His brother, Thomas Jefferson Wells, was the Whig nominee for governor in 1859, against eventual winner Thomas Overton Moore.

In 1860, he supported Stephen A. Douglas, the Northern Democratic candidate for president and was an ardent supporter of the Union. For that, he was criticized by his neighbors and by his brother. During the Civil War, Wells was arrested by Confederate officials for his Union sympathies.

Wells remained on his plantation outside Alexandria until the spring of 1863 when he remarked that the recently deceased Gen. "Stonewall" Jackson should be buried "in a gum coffin, and that the bottom plank might be very thin, so that he might eat his way down to where it was intended that he should go." Soon thereafter, he fled into the woods and briefly organized a band of unionist partisans, or Jayhawkers, to attack rebel supply trains. In November, he left the woods and moved to Union-occupied New Orleans.

By 1864, Union troops controlled all or part of 17 parishes in south Louisiana. Wells formed the Unconditional Union Club of West Louisiana. He was nominated both by radicals such as Benjamin Flanders and moderates such as Michael Hahn, to be Lieutenant Governor.

Statewide office

On March 4, 1864, Wells became lieutenant governor under Governor Michael Hahn.  He supported compensated emancipation for former slaves at the Louisiana Constitutional Convention of 1864. One year later, on March 4, 1865, Wells was inaugurated as governor when Michael Hahn resigned to become a United States Senator. In November 1865, a special election was held under the Reconstruction government, and Governor Wells running as a Democrat defeated former Governor Henry W. Allen (who was in Mexico), with 22,312 votes to Allen's 5,497. As governor, Wells removed radicals from office.

Wells came into conflict with the federal military authority under General Nathaniel P. Banks. He supported Hugh Kennedy as New Orleans mayor and appointed numerous former Confederate officers to state and local offices. He recommended dismantling public education and using only taxes from blacks to pay for freedmen's schools. Wells also wanted to build new levees, a new capitol building, and a state penitentiary, but the Louisiana State Legislature balked at his proposals.

His advocacy of black suffrage caused political unrest and riots which led to his unseating. On July 30, 1866, riots erupted over actions taken under the Constitutional Convention of 1864. Governor Wells did little to prevent violence, and General Philip Sheridan held him responsible. Sheridan removed him from office on June 3, 1867, for the riots and for failing to implement reforms regarding freedmen.

Later years
After being removed as governor, Wells went home to Rapides Parish. In 1872 he supported Republican President Ulysses S. Grant's re-election. During the 1870s Wells returned to politics as a "scalawag" and was known by opponents as "Mad Wells." In 1873, he was appointed chairman of the State Returning Board, which was responsible for determining the legality of ballots and for discarding fraudulent votes. In this, Wells helped Republicans regain some of the votes it lost to white Democrats' anti-Black violence and terror. He was consequently appointed Surveyor of the Port of New Orleans (Customs) from 1874 to 1880.

He died on February 28, 1899, at his residence in Rapides Parish.

Sources

 Political Graveyard
National Governor's Association biography
Walter M. Lowrey, "The Political Career of James Madison Wells," Louisiana Historical Quarterly, 31 (October, 1948), pp. 995–1,123, Louisiana Historical Society.

External links
State of Louisiana -Biography
Cemetery Memorial by La-Cemeteries

 Correspondence with General E. R. S. Canby.

Republican Party governors of Louisiana
1808 births
1899 deaths
Politicians from Alexandria, Louisiana
Southern Unionists in the American Civil War
19th-century American politicians
People from Lecompte, Louisiana